Ben Hartwell Winkelman (February 28, 1899 – December 18, 1981) was an American football player and coach.  He played three seasons with the Milwaukee Badgers of the National Football League (NFL).  Winkelman served as the head football coach at San Jose State University from 1940 to 1941, compiling a record of 16–4–3.

Head coaching record

References

1899 births
1981 deaths
American football ends
Arkansas Razorbacks football players
Cincinnati Bearcats football coaches
Milwaukee Badgers players
San Jose State Spartans football coaches
Stanford Cardinal football coaches
High school football coaches in Texas
Sportspeople from Fayetteville, Arkansas
Players of American football from Arkansas